Condado (Foaled 1934-Death Date Unknown) was a champion racehorse in Puerto Rico who was best known for his statistical achievements on the track which included having 152 career victories and at his peak a winning streak of 43 straight victories.

Background 
Condado was chestnut colt foaled in 1934 in Potrero by breeder Teodoro Viera. He would be owned by José Coll Vidal and trained by Pablo Suárez. He was foaled by American dam Purupupu whose father was a French bred named Allumeur while her dam Olga Virginia was a US-bred horse. His sire was an American stallion named Gadstick who descended from Ben Brush a Hall of Fame champion racehorse who won the 1896 Kentucky Derby.

Career 
Condado made his debut on July 17, 1936 in the Clásico Luis Muñoz Rivera a race where many other Puerto Rican champions such as Galgo Jr would make their debuts. He would not win this race finishing third but he would break his maiden just nine days later on July 26, 1936 with a final time of 1:06.30 for the 1000 meter distance. His two-year-old season would only last seven races but he would manage his first major victory that year with a win in the Clásico Comercio. The following year at the age of three he began a streak of years where he would run against the greatest in Puerto Rico tussling with greats such as Yaucono and Chorisbar who coincidentally were the only horses to have ever won more races than him. At the age of three, he ran a grand total of 39 times and only lost a single time. Beating out Galgo Jr's 30 victories as a three-year-old Yaucono's 32 win three-year-old season and narrowly beating out Chorisbar's 37 win six-year-old season. The following year at the age of four he only lost once again this time out of 31 overall starts that year. His most major winning streaks would come during this time. Firstly winning 37 straight races, then outdoing himself with 43 straight wins which is the fourth biggest winning streak any horse has ever achieved in the history of racing. And then a 10 race winning streak, these three winning streaks were separated by three second-place finishes. If he had won these defeats he could've potentially had a winning streak of 96 straight races.

On February 5, 1939 at Quintana Racetrack he ran against imported racehorses and managed a surprisingly easy win under jockey Guillermo Escobar with a very light 105 pounds of weight aboard. Throughout  his career he was given very light weights maxing out at only 125 pounds compared to other Puerto Rican champions such as Galgo Jr who withstood weights as high as 132 pounds during there career. Condado raced against imported horses again this time with jockey Raúl Sánchez aboard as well as 10 pounds lighter weight at 95 pounds. As well it was at a longer distance of 1 mile and 70 yards but it didn't seem to matter as he crossed the line in 1:49.10.

Later in his career at the ages of six and seven, he ran 81 times winning 59 of them. As well during this period, he set all 5 of his track records although none of them stand today he set these records at distances of 1000 meters to 1 1/16 miles. One of the records was at Quintana while the other four would be at Las Monjas. These would be his final major achievements during his career as at the ages of eight and nine his final years on the track he began to show his age. He only won 2 of 21 starts at the age of 8 and ran very selectively in his final season racing only 5 times and winning 3 of them. Finally helping him break 150 career wins. By the end of his career, he raced a whopping 213 times with 152 victories and 202 of his races having him be third or higher.

Pedigree

References 

1934 racehorse births
Puerto Rican racehorses
Individual male horses
Racehorses trained in Puerto Rico
Racehorses bred in Puerto Rico